"Great Balls of Fire" is a 1957 popular song recorded by American rock and roll musician Jerry Lee Lewis on Sun Records and featured in the 1957 movie Jamboree. It was written by Otis Blackwell and Jack Hammer. The Jerry Lee Lewis 1957 recording was ranked as the 96th greatest song ever by Rolling Stone. The song is in AABA form. The song sold one million copies in its first 10 days of release in the United States making it one of the best-selling singles in the United States at that time.

Song information
The song is best known for Jerry Lee Lewis's original recording, which was recorded in the Sun Studio in Memphis, Tennessee, on October 8, 1957, using three personnel: Lewis (piano/vocals), Sidney Stokes (bass), and a session drummer, Larry Linn, instead of the usual Sun backups Jimmy Van Eaton (drums) and Roland Janes (guitar).  Lewis was quoted in the book JLL: His Own Story by Rick Bragg, (pg 133), as saying "I knew Sidney Stokes but I didn't know him that well either, and I don't know what happened to them people.  That's the last time I ever seen 'em.  That's strange isn't it?" It was released as a 45rpm single on Sun 281 in November 1957. It reached No. 2 on the Billboard pop charts, No. 3 on the R&B charts, and No. 1 on the country charts. It also reached No. 1 on the UK Singles Chart, and appeared on the New Zealand Singles Chart and the Dutch Top 40.

The song was featured in a performance by Jerry Lee Lewis and his band in the 1957 Warner Brothers rock and roll film Jamboree, which also featured Carl Perkins, Fats Domino, Buddy Knox, and Dick Clark. The recording was released in the UK on London Records.

The tune opens up side 2 of Lewis's 1964 album Live at the Star Club, Hamburg.

Chart performance

Legacy
 The song was performed by Levi Kreis in the 2010 musical Million Dollar Quartet, portraying Jerry Lee Lewis.
 The title of the 1989 biopic, Great Balls of Fire! about Lewis, played by Dennis Quaid, is derived from the song title.
 In 2017, WWE held a professional wrestling event titled Great Balls of Fire, referencing the song. Jerry Lawler's personal attorney, who also represents Jerry Lee Lewis, informed him that the singer had actually trademarked the phrase, prompting Lawler to inform them of this. He stated that he "put him in touch with the WWE people, gave him a name. Apparently he called them and got everything worked out. Not only are they using the name, they are using Jerry Lee's song, which is awesome."
Ric Flair revealed he started using his iconic "Wooo!" catchphrase in 1974 after he heard Jerry Lee Lewis sing the lyric, “Goodness gracious, great balls of fire, woo!”

Top Gun franchise
In the 1986 film Top Gun, LTJG Nick "Goose" Bradshaw (portrayed by Anthony Edwards) plays the song in a bar with his family and Pete "Maverick" Mitchell (Tom Cruise). The song is available on the Top Gun soundtrack special edition released in 1999. The song is performed again in the sequel, the 2022 film Top Gun: Maverick by Goose's son LT Bradley "Rooster" Bradshaw (portrayed by Miles Teller). Teller's performance is included on that film's soundtrack Top Gun: Maverick (Music from the Motion Picture), on which it is labeled as a live performance. Paramount Pictures later released the extended scene of Teller's performance as Rooster on YouTube on June 16, 2022.

References

External links

1957 songs
1957 singles
Jerry Lee Lewis songs
Sun Records singles
Songs written by Otis Blackwell
The Newbeats songs
Gary Lewis & the Playboys songs
New Grass Revival songs
Electric Light Orchestra songs
Dolly Parton songs
Fleetwood Mac songs
The Flamingos songs
Grammy Hall of Fame Award recipients
UK Singles Chart number-one singles
The Crickets songs